Corymbia torta is a species of tree that is endemic to the Kimberley region of Western Australia. It has smooth bark, lance-shaped adult leaves, flower buds in groups of three or seven, creamy white flowers and cup-shaped, cylindrical or barrel-shaped fruit.

Description
It has smooth, sometimes powdery white, cream-coloured or pale grey bark that is shed from the tree in thin scales. Flowering has been observed in November and the flowers are creamy white.

Taxonomy and naming
Corymbia torta was first formally described in 1995 by Ken Hill and Lawrie Johnson in the journal Telopea from specimens collected in 1999 by Hill and Leonie Stanberg, near Mount Jameson on the upper Drysdale River. The specific epithet (torta) is from the Latin tortus meaning "twisted", referring to the adult leaves.

In the same journal paper, Hill and Johnson described three subspecies and the names are accepted by the Australian Plant Census:
 Corymbia torta subsp. allanii K.D.Hill & L.A.S.Johnson;
 Corymbia torat subsp. mixtifolia K.D.Hill & L.A.S.Johnson;
 Corymbia torta K.D.Hill & L.A.S.Johnson subsp. torta.

Distribution and habitat
This eucalypt is found in the Wunaamin Miliwundi Ranges, Mitchell River National Park and Drysdale River National Park in the Central Kimberley and Northern Kimberley biogeographic regions It grows in skeletal sandy soils over sandstone or granite.

Conservation status
All three subspecies of C. torta'' are classified as "not threatened" by the Western Australian Government Department of Parks and Wildlife.

See also
List of Corymbia species

References

torta
Myrtales of Australia
Flora of Western Australia
Plants described in 1995
Taxa named by Lawrence Alexander Sidney Johnson
Taxa named by Ken Hill (botanist)